Lesetlheng is a village in the Mankwe region of South Africa, on the borders of the Pilanesberg Game Reserve.

It is home to the Moruleng Stadium, at which Platinum Stars play their matches. The stadium and village have hosted both New Zealand and England national football teams in recent years during their preparation for the 2009 FIFA Confederations Cup and 2010 FIFA World Cup competitions.

References

Populated places in the Moses Kotane Local Municipality